Ragavan  is a 2009 Tamil language film, starring debutants Vijith and Radhika Malhotra, produced under a new banner Aghyna Productions by M Selvaraj and directed by Parandhaman who was an assistant to film director Selvaraghavan. After a long time Gangai Amaran is composing the music for this film. The audio CD was released on 14 February 2009 coinciding with Valentine's Day. The movie was released on 12 June 2009.

Cast 
 Vijith as Ragavan
 Radhika Malhotra as Dhivya
 Manoj K. Jayan as Lakshmipathi
 Singamuthu
 Mayilsamy
 Santhana Bharathi
 Munnar Ramesh

Soundtrack 

The soundtrack consists of seven songs composed by Gangai Amaran.

References

External links 
 Ragavan Movie Stills
 Ragavan Audio Launch Stils

2009 films
2000s Tamil-language films
Films scored by Gangai Amaran